Bridge in West Wheatfield Township is a historic stone arch bridge located at West Wheatfield Township in Indiana County, Pennsylvania. It was built in 1911, and is a  bridge, with a semi-circular arch spanning . It is built of rough, rock faced ashlar with a concrete parapet. It crosses Richard's Run.

It was listed on the National Register of Historic Places in 1988.

References 

Road bridges on the National Register of Historic Places in Pennsylvania
Bridges completed in 1911
Bridges in Indiana County, Pennsylvania
1911 establishments in Pennsylvania
National Register of Historic Places in Indiana County, Pennsylvania
Stone arch bridges in the United States